Lieutenant General Phil du Preez is a former Anti-Aircraft officer of the South African Army.

Early life 
Phil was born in a farm in Natal province and was schooled in the local schools until high school. Upon finishing matric, he enrolled at the SA Army Gymnasium at Voortrekkerhoogte, Pretoria.

Military career 

He served at the Anti-Aircraft Training Centre at Youngsfield from the early sixties after he graduated with bachelor's degree in science from the Military Academy and Stellenbosch University. He served as Battery Commander. Seconded to ARMSCOR for the acquisition of the Crotale missile defence system in France. He participated in Ops SAVANNAH as a Liaison Officer for UNITA in 1975. Chief of Army Staff Logistics, Deputy Chief of Staff Logistics. He succeeded V Adm A.G. Malherbe as Chief of Staff Logistics from 1995 to 1998. Concurrently served as General of the Gunners from 1993 until 1998. He retired from the SANDF in 1998.

Awards and decorations

References

South African generals
Living people
Year of birth missing (living people)